Anna Isabel Poole, Lady Poole (born 11 August 1970) is a Senator of the College of Justice in Scotland.
Prior to her appointment as Senator, she was a Judge of the UK Upper Tribunal, Administrative Appeals Chamber. Lady Poole was educated at Madras College, St Andrews, and at Somerville and Magdalen Colleges, Oxford.

Career 
Lady Poole graduated with first class honours from Oxford University in Law in 1991 (BA Jurisprudence, MA). She completed a postgraduate Masters in 1993 (M.St, Oxon), and went on to qualify as a solicitor of England and Wales in London in 1996. After returning to Scotland, she became a Scottish solicitor in 1997 and an advocate in 1998. She was appointed as a Standing Junior Counsel to the Scottish Government in 2002, Second Standing Junior in 2009, and First Standing Junior in 2010. In 2012, she took silk, becoming Queen's Counsel. She served as an ad hoc advocate depute in 2013.

In 2014 she was appointed as a part-time UK First tier Tribunal Judge in the Social Entitlement Chamber which she combined with practice at the bar. She was elevated to a salaried judge of the UK Upper Tribunal in 2018. She was appointed to sit in the Upper Tribunal for Scotland in 2020.

In addition to her legal career, Lady Poole worked at the universities of Dundee and Edinburgh as a research assistant and a tutor respectively, and serves as Chancellor for the Diocese of Edinburgh. She is a Fellow of the Chartered Institute of Arbitrators, after completing a course in arbitration at the University of Aberdeen.

Lady Poole was formally installed at a ceremony in Parliament House on 10 January 2020. She served as Chair to the Scottish Covid-19 Inquiry between 14 December 2021 and 27 October 2022. She is a co-author of a book on judicial review with Sheriff Frances McCartney and Sheriff Lorna Drummond (A Practical Guide to Public Law Litigation in Scotland Drummond, McCartney and Poole, 2019) and is a contributor to Court of Session Practice edited by Lord Donald MacFadyen.

References 

Living people
Alumni of Somerville College, Oxford
People educated at Madras College
Scottish King's Counsel
21st-century King's Counsel
Scottish solicitors
21st-century Scottish judges
Scottish women judges
Senators of the College of Justice
Year of birth missing (living people)
21st-century women judges